STOBAR ("short take-off but arrested recovery" or "short take-off, barrier-arrested recovery") is a system used for the launch and recovery of aircraft from the deck of an aircraft carrier, combining elements of "short take-off and vertical landing" (STOVL) with "catapult-assisted take-off but arrested recovery" (CATOBAR).

Aircraft launch under their own power using a ski-jump to assist take-off (rather than using a catapult). However, the planes are conventional, rather than STOVL aircraft, and thus require arrestor wires to land on the ship. The STOBAR system is simpler to build than CATOBAR. , it has been used regularly on Russian, Indian, and Chinese carriers.

Advantages 
Compared to CATOBAR, STOBAR is less expensive to develop. It is easier to operate than a CATOBAR configuration, which requires large number of operators to launch the aircraft. The lack of any moving parts in a ski-jump makes it less expensive to maintain than a catapult. It does not require any additional system to generate force required to launch the aircraft, unlike CATOBAR where an external force is needed to be generated either from steam catapult or Electromagnetic Aircraft Launch System (EMALS) to launch the aircraft.

Limitations 

One major limitation of STOBAR configuration is that it only works with fighter aircraft that have a high thrust-to-weight ratio such as Su-33 or MiG-29K and thus limits the kind of aircraft that can be operated from the carrier. It is not known what restrictions ski-jump takeoff implies on maximal aircraft weight. According to some sources, in order to become airborne, the aircraft may be required to limit its weaponry and fuel package in order to reduce the launch weight of the aircraft. However, according to other sources, the Super Hornet can take-off from a ski-jump with a significant weapons load. Using ski-jump can limit the ability to conduct sorties faster on STOBAR aircraft carrier.

List of STOBAR aircraft 

 HAL Tejas – two naval variants are being developed for the Indian Navy; a prototype (NP-1) is currently undergoing flight testing.
 Mikoyan MiG-29K – currently active with the Indian Navy and the Russian Navy.
 Sukhoi Su-33 – developed from Su-27 and only operated by the Russian Navy.

Users
India is in the process of inducting its first indigenous aircraft carrier which is undergoing extensive sea trials.

Active STOBAR aircraft carriers

References

Aircraft carriers
Types of take-off and landing